Urs Fischer (born 20 February 1966) is a Swiss former football player and current manager of Union Berlin.

Playing career
During his playing career, Fischer only played for two clubs: FC Zürich and FC St. Gallen. He was captain of both teams and is the all-time leading player with 545 caps in the Swiss Super League. He started his career in the youth department of FC Zürich and played his first game as professional 7 April 1984 aged 18 in a 1–6 loss against FC Sion. His only title is the win of the Swiss Cup 2000. Fischer played four national caps for Switzerland under coach Ulrich Stielike.

Coaching career
Fischer quit playing professional football in 2003. He then coached the U-14, U-16 and U-21-teams of FC Zürich. After a short spell as the assistant manager of Bernard Challandes in 2007-2008, he returned to the U-21. When Challandes was sacked, Fischer was appointed as caretaker 17 April 2010 and after three games, which he all lost, became permanent manager. He finished the 2010–11 season with FC Zürich second behind FC Basel. He was sacked by FC Zürich in 2012 following a poor league finish, his replacement Rolf Fringer would not last much longer, with a fellow coach under Fisher in Urs Meier being brought in to coach FC Zürich for the remainder of 2013.

On 18 June 2015, Basel announced that Fischer had signed a two-year contract as first team manager. On 10 April 2017, the newly established FC Basel management announced that they would not extend his contract.

Fischer was announced as new head coach of 2. Bundesliga side 1. FC Union Berlin on 1 June 2018, signing a two-year contract with the club. In his first season with the club, he led Union to a historical promotion in Bundesliga after a third-place finish that enabled them to participate in the promotion play-offs, where they beat VfB Stuttgart on away goals. In December 2020, he signed a contract extension, keeping him at the club until 2023. In the 2020–21 season, he led Union to a seventh-place finish, thus qualifying for the inaugural UEFA Europa Conference League edition, In the 2021–22 season, he led Union to a fifth-place finish, thus qualifying for the UEFA Europa League for the first time ever in history.

Managerial statistics

Honours

As player
Zürich
 Swiss Cup: 1999–2000

As manager
Basel
 Swiss Super League: 2015–16, 2016–17
 Swiss Cup winner: 2016–17

References

External links
Profile at FC Zurich Stats
Urs Fischer on the official SFL site

1966 births
Living people
Switzerland international footballers
FC Zürich players
FC St. Gallen players
Swiss Super League players
Swiss men's footballers
Swiss football managers
FC Zürich managers
FC Thun managers
FC Basel managers
1. FC Union Berlin managers
2. Bundesliga managers
Swiss expatriate football managers
Expatriate football managers in Germany
Swiss expatriate sportspeople in Germany
Association football central defenders
Bundesliga managers
Sportspeople from the canton of Lucerne